Lieutenant-Colonel William Boynton (14 July 1641 – 17 August 1689) was an English  Member of Parliament.

He was the eldest son of Sir Francis Boynton, 2nd Baronet of Barmston.

He entered Parliament in 1680 as member for Hedon, remaining an MP until 1685.

Dying before his father, he never succeeded to the baronetcy. He married Elizabeth Bernard, daughter of John Bernard of Hull, and they had three children:
 Griffith Boynton (1664–1731), who succeeded as 3rd Baronet in 1695.
 Mary
 Constance, who married Richard Kirkshaw

References
 
 Boynton Pedigree

1641 births
1689 deaths
Members of the Parliament of England for Hedon
English MPs 1680–1681
English MPs 1681